Valu-mart (styled as valu-mart) is a chain of supermarkets based in Ontario, Canada. It is a unit of National Grocers, itself a unit of Loblaw Companies Limited, Canada's largest food distributor.

Stores are typically operated by a franchise owner. The stores operate in smaller locations than others operated by Loblaw Companies Limited, and are often opened in former locations where other Loblaw Companies Limited stores had been, including those formerly operated under the Zehrs or Mr. Grocer banners.

All Valu-mart stores are located in the province of Ontario with one additional store located in Shawville, Quebec.

See also
 Your Independent Grocer
 List of supermarket chains in Canada

References

Companies based in Brampton
Loblaw Companies
Supermarkets of Canada